Edmond John Clarke Speck (1886 – 16 April 1959) was an Australian politician.

He was born in Forbes to grazier Robert Speck and Dorothy Ann Clarke. He attended Lachlan College and became a grazier, inheriting the family property on his father's death in 1929. He was a councillor for Jemalong Shire from 1937 to 1944, and in 1945 married Ina Peasley. From 1940 to 1952 he was a member of the New South Wales Legislative Council, first for the United Australia Party and then for the Liberal Party. Speck died at Forbes in 1959.

References

1886 births
1959 deaths
United Australia Party members of the Parliament of New South Wales
Liberal Party of Australia members of the Parliament of New South Wales
Members of the New South Wales Legislative Council
20th-century Australian politicians